Stuart McMillan is the name of several people including:
 Stuart McMillan (footballer) (1896–1963),  English footballer and cricketer
 Stu MacMillan (1908–1992), American football player
 Stuart McMillan (church leader) (born 1955), former President of the Uniting Church in Australia 
 Stuart MacMillan (born 1966), one of the members of Slam (DJs) from Scotland
 Stuart McMillan (born 1972), Scottish National Party Member of the Scottish Parliament